The following television stations broadcast on digital channel 26 in Mexico:

 XEWO-TDT in Guadalajara, Jalisco 
 XHAPA-TDT in Apatzingán, Michoacán de Ocampo 
 XHCCB-TDT in Ciudad Constitución, Baja California Sur 
 XHCGA-TDT in Aguascalientes, Aguascalientes 
 XHCJ-TDT in Sabinas, Coahuila de Zaragoza
 XHCKW-TDT in Colima, Colima
 XHCQO-TDT in Chetumal, Quintana Roo
 XHCTCZ-TDT in Cerro Azul, Veracruz
 XHCTLE-TDT in León, Guanajuato
 XHCTSA-TDT in Saltillo, Coahuila
 XHCVI-TDT in Ciudad Victoria, Tamaulipas
 XHDB-TDT in Durango, Durango 
 XHDG-TDT in Oaxaca, Oaxaca 
 XHEBC-TDT in Ensenada, Baja California 
 XHFI-TDT in Chihuahua, Chihuahua
 XHFW-TDT in Tampico, Tamaulipas 
 XHGOC-TDT in Ocampo, Guanajuato 
 XHGV-TDT on Cerro de Las Lajas, Veracruz
 XHGWT-TDT in Guerrero Negro, Baja California Sur
 XHHPT-TDT in Hidalgo Del Parral, Chihuahua 
 XHIGG-TDT in Iguala, Guerrero 
 XHLCM-TDT in Lázaro Cárdenas, Michoacán de Ocampo
 XHNTV-TDT in Tepic, Nayarit
 XHNON-TDT in Nogales, Sonora
 XHOMT-TDT in Ometepec, Guerrero
 XHPMS-TDT in Matehuala, San Luis Potosí 
 XHQUR-TDT in Querétaro, Querétaro de Arteaga 
 XHRIO-TDT in Matamoros, Tamaulipas
 XHSJC-TDT in San José del Cabo, Baja California Sur
 XHSPRCA-TDT in Coatzacoalcos, Veracruz
 XHSPRTP-TDT in Tapachula, Chiapas
 XHTOB-TDT in Torreón, Coahuila
 XHTOE-TDT in Tenosique, Tabasco 
 XHTVM-TDT in Mexico City
 XHVFC-TDT in Villaflores, Chiapas 

26